Lodovico Altieri (17 July 1805 – 11 August 1867) was an Italian Roman Catholic cardinal. He served in various capacities under various popes and belonged to a noble Roman house making him a descendant of Pope Clement X.

The sainthood process commenced under Pope Benedict XVI and the late cardinal has been titled as a Servant of God.

Life
Lodovico Altieri was born in Rome in 1805 as the last of three children to Paluzzo Altieri (July 7,1760- October 1.1834) and Maria Anna von Sachsen (October 20, 1770- December 24, 1845). His two older siblings were Clemente (June.8.1795-June 21, 1873) and Augusto (1797-1860) who became a Jesuit. His father served from 1801 until his death as the commander for the Papal Noble Guard after Pope Pius VII named him to that position. His brother Clemente succeeded their father in that role. He was baptized in the parish of San Marco mere moments after his birth.

He was ordained to the priesthood in Rome on 24 March 1833.

He was named after his ordination as the qualificator for the Congregation of the Inquisition while he served as the vicar for the Santa Maria in Via Lata school. During this time he also served as the aide for the Congregation of Studies. His rise through the ranks continued after he was appointed as the Titular Archbishop of Ephesus; he received his episcopal consecration from the pope himself in Saint Peter's Basilica. The co-consecrators were Giovanni Soglia Ceroni and Giovanni Giacomo Sinibaldi.

He was also appointed as the apostolic nuncio to Austria just after his consecration. His aide in the nunciature was the future cardinal Gaetano Bedini. It was he who encouraged Bedini to expose himself to the Church's diplomatic atmosphere.

The pope created him as a cardinal but reserved him in pectore on 14 December 1840. His name was not announced until 21 April 1845 and he was made the Cardinal-Priest of Santa Maria in Campitelli (the diaconate was elevated pro hac vice to a titular rank).

He participated in the conclave in 1846 that elected Pope Pius IX. In that conclave he supported the candidature of Cardinal Mastai-Ferretti which formed a knit group among cardinals such as Clarissimo Falconieri Mellini and Luigi Amat di San Filippo e Sorso. The disorder in 1848 saw Altieri flee with Pius IX to Gaeta. Pius IX held Altieri in great esteem and Altieri proved himself the center of opposition within the cardinalate to Giacomo Antonelli. Altieri was a member of the Red Triumvirate that governed Rome between 1849 and 1850 after the short-lived Roman Republic together with cardinals Luigi Vannicelli Casoni and Gabriele Sermattei della Genga.

He was the aide for the Congregation for Memorials from 1855 to 1857 and was later appointed Camerlengo of the Holy Roman Church on 19 March 1857; the cardinal held that position until his death. He later opted for the order of Cardinal-Bishops and assumed the suburbicarian see of Albano on 17 December 1860. He was later appointed as the Prefect of the Congregation of the Index on 5 September 1861 and then appointed as the archpriest for the Basilica of Saint John Lateran on 8 March 1863. Altieri had little interactions with Saint Giovanni Bosco and once sent him in 1867 funds for Bosco's apostolic work in Turin.

During the cholera epidemic that affected his suburbicarian see he assisted and tended to the ill though contracted it himself and died of it later on 11 August 1867. His funeral took place in Santa Maria in Campitelli and his remains were interred in Campo Verano before being transferred.

Beatification process
The beatification process commenced under Pope Benedict XVI once the Congregation for the Causes of Saints issued the official "nihil obstat" (no objections) and titled him as a Servant of God on 14 March 2009. The diocesan process of the investigation was inaugurated in Albano on 22 November 2009 and concluded its investigations later on 26 September 2015.

The current postulator for this cause is Dr. Ulderico Parente.

See also
Altieri family

References

External links
 Hagiography Circle
 Catholic Hierarchy 

1805 births
1867 deaths
19th-century Italian cardinals
19th-century Italian Roman Catholic archbishops
19th-century venerated Christians
Apostolic Nuncios to Austria
Bishops appointed by Pope Gregory XVI
Burials at Campo Verano
Camerlengos of the Holy Roman Church
Cardinal-bishops of Albano
Cardinals created by Pope Gregory XVI
Deaths from cholera
Italian Servants of God
Clergy from Rome